Aditi Ravi is an Indian model and actress, who appears in Malayalam films. She pursued a career in modelling before becoming an actress, debuting with a commercial for The Times of India during her college education. She made her acting debut with the 2014 film Angry Babies in Love, in a supporting role. Her first female lead role was in the 2017 film Alamara.

Early and personal life

Aditi was born at Thrissur, Kerala, in India as the daughter of Ravi and Geetha. She has two siblingsRakesh (brother) and Rakhi (sister). She graduated with a degree from Christ College, Irinjalakuda, Thrissur. Aditi currently resides in Kochi.

Career
She began her modelling career during her college education, she was selected after applying for appearing in a commercial for The Times of India. Later she acted in a number of commercials for various brands. She debuted as an actress in 2014, in a supporting role in the Malayalam romantic-drama film Angry Babies in Love, directed by Saji Surendran. She played the role, Maria, a model coordinator in a modelling agency. Before the film released, she was cast in two more films, Third World Boys and Beware of Dogs in the same year. She played Teena in Beware of Dogs. In 2014, she also appeared in the music video, Yelove, alongside Siddharth Menon, she was voiced by Shreya Ghoshal. She appeared in her first female lead role in 2017 with the film Alamara, opposite Sunny Wayne. She was selected after auditioning for the role. The film directed by Midhun Manuel Thomas was a satirical comedy surrounding around the custom of gifting a cupboard as part of dowry in Kerala weddings. Some other films are Aadhi, directed by Jeethu Joseph, and Tick Tock.

Filmography

Music albums

Short films

Awards and nominations

References

External links
 

Living people
Indian film actresses
Actresses from Thrissur
Actresses in Malayalam cinema
21st-century Indian actresses
Female models from Kerala
Year of birth missing (living people)
Actresses in Tamil cinema